Gerrit Jacobus van Wyk (born ) is a South African rugby union player who plays for the  in the Currie Cup and the Rugby Challenge. His regular position is centre.

References

South African rugby union players
Living people
1993 births
People from Matzikama Local Municipality
Rugby union centres
Boland Cavaliers players
Rugby union players from the Western Cape